Dishant Harendra Yagnik (born 22 June 1983) is a former Indian cricketer and coach. He was a wicketkeeper who represented Rajasthan in domestic cricket. He was also a member of Rajasthan Royals in Indian Premier League. He is currently the fielding coach of Rajasthan Royals.

References

External links

1983 births
Living people
Indian cricketers
Rajasthan cricketers
Rajasthan Royals cricketers
Delhi Giants cricketers
Central Zone cricketers
Wicket-keepers